Cataclysta polyrrapha is a Crambidae species in the genus Cataclysta. It was described by Turner in 1937, and is known from Australia.

References

Moths described in 1937
Acentropinae